The Canal de Neufossé is a French canal connecting the Aa River in Arques to the Canal d'Aire in Aire-sur-la-Lys.  It is a segment of the Canal Dunkerque-Escaut.  In 1760, the Neufossé canal was built to link the river Lys to the Aa, and give Lille and other inland towns a French route to the sea.

See also
 List of canals in France

References

External links

 Project Babel

Neufosse
Transport in Hauts-de-France
Buildings and structures in Pas-de-Calais
Canals opened in 1760